Aleksandr Avdeyev may refer to:

 Aleksandr Avdeyev (pilot) (1916–1942), Soviet fighter ace of World War II
 Aleksandr Avdeyev (politician) (born 1946), Russian politician and diplomat
 Aleksandr Avdeyev (canoeist) (born 1956), Soviet sprint canoer 
 Aleksandr Avdeyev (politician, born 1975), Russian politician, acting governor of Vladimir Oblast

See also
Avdeyev